, also known as Vampire Host, is a manga by Kaori Yuki. Appearing as a serial in the Japanese manga magazines Hana to Yume and Bessatsu Hana to Yume, the chapters of Blood Hound were compiled into a bound volume and published by Hakusensha in June 2004. Two more chapters followed in the January 2005 and August 2010 issues of Bessatsu Hana to Yume, as did a re-release in August 2010.

It focuses on a naive, loudmouthed teenager named Rion, who investigates a host club full of vampires when she suspects they must be related to the disappearance of a lot of people in the neighborhood, including her best friend. In the process she begins to befriend them, especially the leader Suou, with whom she develops a romantic relationship. Ultimately, she figures out the vampires are not the cause of the disappearances, but her adventures with the vampires are only beginning.

Vampire Host is a live-action television drama series loosely based on this manga.  The series has been licensed in North America by Bandai Entertainment under the title of Bloodhound.

Characters 

Rion Kanou – A teenager who initially suspects that the Host Club Krankenhaus is behind the disappearance of several people in her community, including her best friend. In the end, she figures out that the vampires are not responsible for the disappearances, but her school guidance councilor, who has sexual fetishism for blood.
Suou – The lead host of Krankenhaus, who begins to develop a romantic relationship with Rion. He also suspects that she is the reincarnation of Ellone, "the one with the purest blood," whom he once loved.

Media

Manga
Written and illustrated by Kaori Yuki, Blood Hound debuted in the Japanese monthly manga magazine Bessatsu Hana to Yume in the January 2003 issue. The second chapter ran in the May 2004 issue of Bessatsu Hana to Yume, while the third appeared in the ninth issue of its biweekly sister magazine, Hana to Yume, for 2004. Hakusensha compiled the chapters into a bound volume and published it on 5 June 2004. Two more chapters later appeared in the January 2005 and August 2010 issues of Bessatsu Hana to Yume, and a re-release of the manga followed on 19 August 2010.

Blood Hound has been translated into French by Tonkam, Italian by Panini Comics, and German by Carlsen Comics.

TV Drama
Blood Hound was adapted into a twelve episode TV drama as  starring Minako Komukai and TSUBASA GACKY.

Bandai Entertainment licensed the drama and released the episodes in three volumes from April 17, 2007, to August 21, 2007.

See also
Vampire film
List of vampire television series

Notes

References

External links

TV Tokyo Vampire Host website
Toho Vampire Host website
Bloodhound at Bandai Entertainment (archive URL) 
MangaNews.com review 
Manga Sanctuary review 
Splash Comics review 

Drama anime and manga
Hakusensha franchises
Hakusensha manga
Kaori Yuki
Romance anime and manga
Shōjo manga
TV Tokyo original programming
Vampires in anime and manga